The Panhard 24 is a compact two-door coupé automobile produced between 1964 and 1967 by French manufacturer Panhard. It was powered by a front-mounted air-cooled two-cylinder boxer motor: the basic design of this unconventional engine dated back to the 1940s. In 1965, a lengthened Panhard 24 was launched and promoted as a two-door four- or five-seat saloon. Plans for a four-door version which might have enabled the car more effectively to replace the commercially successful Panhard PL 17 saloon were never implemented, however.

Although the 24 had no Panhard badged successor, a number of the features of the Citroën GS which appeared (after an unusually long gestation period) in 1970 respected Panhard traditions. The Panhard 24 may be thought of as the swan song of Panhard automobile production (since 1967 the Panhard business has concentrated on manufacturing light military vehicles).

Background
Panhard was among the earliest automobile producers and, by some criteria, the first volume auto producer in the world, in 1890.

In 1955, Citroën had taken a 25 percent holding in Panhard's automobile business and from this time onwards the two brands were increasingly managed as a single range. During the next two years, the national dealership networks of the two businesses were integrated. This gave Citroën and Panhard dealers an expanded market coverage, incorporating now a small car, a medium-sized saloon and a large car range. It gave Citroën desperately needed production capacity at Panhard's Ivry plant which from now on produced Citroën 2CV Fourgonettes (light vans) alongside Panhard sedans.

In the second half of the 1950s, the integration of the sales and service networks energised sales of the Panhard Dyna Z and of its successor, the Panhard PL 17. Nevertheless, product development decisions tended to favour the Citroën brand ahead of Panhards, which also seem to have lost out to the Citroën Fourgonette in respect of production capacity allocation.

During the later 1950s, the Citroën DS range extended its appeal downmarket with the more aggressively priced Citroën ID. 1961 saw the launch of the Citroën Ami, effectively representing an upmarket and modernised version of the Citroën 2CV. It is also clear that plugging the gap in Citroën's range with a Citroën-branded model was being mooted many years before the 1970 arrival of the Citroën GS.

In looking to upgrade their popular PL 17, Panhard faced strong opposition from Citroën president Pierre Bercot to any new model that could trespass significantly on market segments where Citroën had an existing or planned presence of their own. This appears to be the reason why the firm's roomy four-door sedan found itself replaced by a coupé design, in the form of the Panhard 24. The proposal by the Panhard design team to fit the 24 with a four-cylinder engine was also blocked, on cost grounds, in favour of the existing Panhard two-cylinder unit.

The body
The car featured a low modern body line with a prominent waist level groove reminiscent of the then fashionable Chevrolet Corvair. At a time when monocoque construction was becoming mainstream, the 24 sat on a separate and very strong tubular steel chassis: it was therefore possible, even using the economically available materials of the time, to keep the window pillars relatively thin which gave the car an airy cabin and outstanding all-round visibility, while class leading structural rigidity for the body could nonetheless be claimed, thanks to the pleating and reinforcement of the roof panel. The tubular steel front and rear subchassis were bolted to a platform frame that comprised the floor and the flat steel sidemembers. Under the skin, the structural architecture was little changed from that of the Dyna 54.

Although the basic engine format had changed little since 1948, the lack of a radiator and the low profile of the boxer-motor configuration made it possible for the Panhard to achieve an exceptionally low and streamlined front end that sat well with more recent styling trends. (Citroën's own DS design, constrained by the taller profile of its more conventional water-cooled unit, achieved a similarly wind cheating front profile only by setting the engine some forty centimetres back from the front of the car: the DS19 used essentially the power unit of the Traction Avant, using the same front-wheel-drive layout with the engine set directly behind the front wheels and the clutch and gearbox ahead of the engine.)

The Panhard 24 incorporated twin head lights set back in the body of the car and covered by a single glass cover, a styling cue that would be adopted for the Citroën DS in 1967.   The stainless steel front bumpers / fenders, each in three sections to facilitate replacement, were integrated into the body line in a way that reduced drag and foreshadowed future designs.

The interior
The interior was well-appointed for this size of car, reflecting a determination not to let the car compete on price in the volume end of the small car market (already by now contested by the Citroën Ami). The Panhard 24 was one of the first cars to offer optional seat belts. The front seat backs were adjustable for rake and the seats were also – unusually at this time – adjustable for height. The passenger's sun visor included a vanity mirror with its own light and the steering wheel was adjustable. The car also boasted an unusually elaborate heater.

A much more basic version, the 24 BA, was briefly offered in 1966: it was not vigorously marketed, however, and only 161 were built.

The engine
Although the Panhard 24 had a new modern body, the engine design was older. The two-cylinder air-cooled boxer motor of 848 cc, harked back to the 850 cc engine that had first appeared in the Panhard Dyna X in 1952 (itself an enlarged version of Panhard's 610 cc boxer motor first seen in 1947). The engines were compact and efficient, but they had originally been developed for aluminium bodied cars: by the 1960s, it was no longer economically practical to construct cars in this price bracket out of aluminium, and while the Panhard 24 was not a heavy car, it was heavier than earlier Panhard saloons. At the same time, the competition had not been standing still. The claimed maximum speed ranged from 135 km/h (84 mph) for the long-wheelbase 42 PS Panhard 24 to 150 (93 mph) for the short-wheelbase 50 PS version. A slightly faster Tiger 10 S-engined version was reportedly capable of 160 km/h (100 mph). The 24's performance was adequate, but probably fell short of the expectations triggered by the car's sporty profile. And power delivery from an air-cooled flat two-cylinder engine did not sound as effortless as from the four-cylinder water-cooled power units on which the European auto industry by this time was increasingly standardising for the middle market. It has also been suggested that engine reliability suffered because many of the younger generation of car mechanics were not fully familiar with all the eccentricities of the Panhard power plants.

Running gear
Also familiar from a succession of post-war Panhard saloons was the four-speed all-synchromesh gear box and the front-wheel-drive configuration. The wheels were independently suspended with telescopic shock absorbers and a torsion bar for the rear axle.

The drum brakes with which the early 24s were delivered drew criticism for inadequate stopping power and excessive vibration: after 1965 the 24BT and 24CT received front disc brakes which addressed the problem.

Chronology
The car received a press launch on 23 June 1963. A two-tone Panhard 24 CT coloured in plum and grey was presented (although two-tone paintwork would "not" be a regular feature of the production versions). Journalists were shown the car in a large garden near Montlhéry, with a backdrop of antique statues and rose bushes, complemented by imaginative lighting effects.

Two versions were offered from 1964, being the 24 C and the 24 CT. The C had a relatively basic interior and an advertised engine output of 42 bhp (DIN) equating to 50 bhp (SAE): relatively few were sold and this version was dropped after a year. The CT was more luxuriously equipped and boasted an engine output of 50 bhp (DIN) equating to 60 bhp (SAE). The CT would prove more popular: it continued in production until 1967.

It seems that overall sales volumes were from the start lower than Panhard had anticipated for the car, which may have contributed to arguments against progressing development of the four-door version that had been envisaged. Although mid-size two-door saloons sold in reasonable numbers in Germany and the Alpine countries, a glance at the sales data suggests that in the French market four doors were a precondition for healthy sales volumes.

In 1965, the  wheelbase versions became available, offering space for four or five, but still only with two doors. These were designated the Panhard 24 B and the Panhard 24 BT. Equipment levels and engine options were as for the shorter C and CT versions.

In 1966, possibly in a belated bid for the mass market, a stripped down basic version, the Panhard 24 BA was offered. In contrast to the 24s offered for sale thus far, this one had a very basic interior. Even the lidded glove box was replaced by an open shelf. Very few 24 BAs were produced, although enthusiasts have suggested that they nevertheless compromised the upmarket image of the more expensive versions. Production of the Panhard 24 officially ended on 20 July 1967.

Citroën, having been an influential shareholder with a 25% holding since 1955, assumed full control of Panhard's automotive business in April 1965. During 1964 and 1965, Panhard had produced approximately 10,000 24s per year: 1966 saw that rate approximately halved. Still desperately short of production capacity, Citroën had the option of developing the Panhard 24 and perpetuating the Panhard brand, but the capacity of the Ivry plant was used to increase the output of the 2 CV vans which had a larger demand. It is hard to establish how far plans for a four-door Panhard 24, for an estate version and for a cabriolet were permitted to progress as these range extending variants never saw the light of day.

There had been no medium-sized sedan bearing the Citroën name since the 1930s. The Citroën GS introduced in 1970 finally plugged that gap in the Citroën range, and in the process paid tribute to the Panhard heritage. The GS was an exceptionally aerodynamic, modern and spacious medium-sized sedan with a compact air-cooled four-cylinder boxer motor driving the front wheels. Apart from the number of cylinders, that description fits pretty well with the car the Panhard 24 would have become had Panhard been permitted to build the range into a more direct replacement for the Panhard PL 17.

Uruguayan Production of Panhard 24ct

An unsanctioned fibre glass bodied Panhard 24ct was built in Uruguay for the local market by the Uruguayan manufacturer of Panhard vehicles. These cars are distinguishable by their colour coded fibre glass bumpers. Uruguayan 24ct production continued beyond that of the official French version, the last units being sold as 1968 models.

Data

Notes

Sources and further reading
Dominique Pagneux, Guide Panhard tous les modèles de 1945 à 1967, E/P/A, 1993
Dominique Pagneux, Panhard, Le grand Livre, E/P/A, Paris 1996
Bernard Vermeylen, Panhard et Levassor, entre tradition et modernité, ETAI, 2005
Yann Le Lay et Bernard Vermeylen, "La Panhard 24 de mon père", ETAI, 1996
L'Archives du Collectionneur, e.p.a. Dyna 54 etc., PL17, 24
Benoit Pérot, "Panhard, la doyenne d'avant garde", e.p.a., Paris, 1979
Panhard factory repair manuals and parts books

24
Subcompact cars
Front-wheel-drive vehicles
Cars introduced in 1964
Cars powered by boxer engines
Group 4 (racing) cars